Haemonides is a genus of moths within the family Castniidae.

Species
Haemonides candida (Houlbert, 1917)
Haemonides cronida (Herrich-Schäffer, [1854])
Haemonides cronis (Cramer, [1775])

References

Castniidae